Sir Howard Frank Trayton Smith  (15 October 1919 – 7 May 1996) was a British diplomat who served as Director General of MI5 from 1978 to 1981.

Career
Educated at Sidney Sussex College, Cambridge, Smith worked at Bletchley Park during World War II and later  became the British ambassador to Moscow. At college in Cambridge, Smith was a contemporary of Asa Briggs, playing chess with him and recommending Briggs to fellow Cambridge mathematician Gordon Welchman for service in Hut 6.

Smith joined the Foreign Office in 1939. From 1946 to 1950, Smith served in the Foreign Service in Oslo and Washington. In 1953, he was Consul in Caracas; between 1961 and 1963, he was Counsellor of State in Moscow.

Smith served as Ambassador to Czechoslovakia from 1968 to 1971 and later served as Ambassador to the Soviet Union in Moscow from 1976 to 1978.

In 1978 Smith was unexpectedly appointed Director General (DG) of MI5, the United Kingdom's internal security service, by Prime Minister James Callaghan, serving until March 1981. He was the first DG from a background in the diplomatic service. Callaghan later explained that he: wanted 'to bring someone into the office from a different culture'.

Honours 

 Companion of the Order of St Michael and St George, 1966
 Knight Commander of the Order of St Michael and St George, 1976
 Knight Grand Cross of the Order of St Michael and St George, 1981

References

1919 births
1996 deaths
Directors General of MI5
Knights Grand Cross of the Order of St Michael and St George
Bletchley Park people
Ambassadors of the United Kingdom to the Soviet Union
Members of HM Diplomatic Service
Ambassadors of the United Kingdom to Czechoslovakia
British mathematicians
Alumni of Sidney Sussex College, Cambridge
20th-century British diplomats